Andrew John Squire (born 9 March 1964) is a former English cricketer.  Squire was a right-handed batsman who bowled right-arm medium pace.  He was born in Mildenhall, Suffolk.

Squire made his debut for Suffolk in the 1985 Minor Counties Championship against Cambridgeshire.  Squire played Minor counties cricket infrequently for Suffolk from 1985 to 2001, which included 68 Minor Counties Championship appearances and 10 MCCA Knockout Trophy matches. He made his List A debut against Essex in the 1993 NatWest Trophy.  He made 3 further List A appearances, the last of which came against Herefordshire in the 2nd round of the 2002 Cheltenham & Gloucester Trophy, which was played in 2001. In his 4 List A matches, he scored 46 runs at an average of 11.50, with a high score of 29.

References

External links
Andrew Squire at ESPNcricinfo
Andrew Squire at CricketArchive

1964 births
Living people
People from Mildenhall, Suffolk
English cricketers
Suffolk cricketers